Hiren Naag is a former Bollywood director of Hindi films who is best known for his association with Tarachand Barjatya of Rajshri Productions for which he directed hit film Geet Gaata Chal (1975), the blockbuster Ankhiyon Ke Jharokhon Se (1978) and another hit Abodh (1984). For latter, Naag is credited for successfully launching the career of Madhuri Dixit.

Filmography as director

 Honeymoon (1973)
 Geet Gaata Chal (1975)
 Ankhiyon Ke Jharokhon Se (1978)
 Abodh (1984)
 Darpan (1985)

Other films

 1983 Film Hi Film
 1981 Aakhri Mujra
 1980 Maan Abhiman
 1980 Saajan Mere Main Saajan Ki
 1979 Sunayana
 1972 Bigalito Karuna Janhabi Jamuna
 1972 Andha Atit
 1967 Jiban Mrityu
 1965 Thana Theke Aschi

References

External links
 

20th-century Indian film directors
Hindi-language film directors
20th-century births
Possibly living people
Year of birth missing (living people)